Byeon Woo-seok (born October 31, 1991) is a South Korean actor and model. He is known for his roles in Live Up to Your Name (2017), Flower Crew: Joseon Marriage Agency (2019), Search: WWW (2019), Record of Youth (2020), and Moonshine (2021-22), also gained widespread recognition for his leading role in the film 20th Century Girl (2022).

Career
He first made his debut as a model in 2014.  

He made his debut as an actor in 2016, playing a minor role as Ha-jin's boyfriend in the SBS historical drama Moon Lovers: Scarlet Heart Ryeo.  

In 2019, he played a supporting role in Search: WWW. The same year, he played Do-joon in the JTBC television series Flower Crew: Joseon Marriage Agency and was praised by the audience. 

In 2020, he got cast in a lead role in the tvN television series Record of Youth as Won Hae-hyo, starring opposite of Park So-dam and Park Bo-gum.

In 2021, he was cast in KBS2's historical drama Moonshine as Lee Pyo, the rebellious crown prince, alongside  Yoo Seung-ho, Lee Hye-ri and Kang Mi-na.

Filmography

Film

Television

Television Show

Hosting

Music video appearances

Awards and nominations

Listicles

Notes

References

External links
 
 

1991 births
Living people
21st-century South Korean male actors
South Korean male models
South Korean male television actors
South Korean male film actors